Julie Ow is an American actress. Born and raised in Oakland, California, Julie has appeared in television shows such as The Master, Hotel, L.A. Law, Tour of Duty, the revival series of Mission: Impossible, Hunter, Living Single, Temporarily Yours, Melrose Place, Babylon 5, Cybill, Hawaii, two episodes of Lost, the Lifetime movie Special Delivery, and the indie feature film Savasana. Julie Ow is a ventriloquist. Julie and her puppet, Sock, perform with the Screen Actors Guild Foundation children's literacy program, BookPALS. Their webisode "Sock and Shu" is available on YouTube. Julie Ow is the CEO and Founder of Planet Jelly Donut, an internet source for positive quotes and affirmations. The organization was created after Julie wrote the self-help novella POPULATION OF 1, an inspirational adult fairy tale, published 2006.

References

External links

American television actresses
Living people
Ventriloquists
Year of birth missing (living people)
Place of birth missing (living people)
21st-century American women